Chanev, Tchanev is a Bulgarian surname. Notable people with the surname include:

 Kamen Tchanev (Kamen Chanev), Bulgarian operatic tenor
 Rousy Chanev (born 1945), Bulgarian actor
 Valchan Chanev (born 1992), Bulgarian footballer

Bulgarian-language surnames